Arianna in Nasso is an 1815 "azione drammatica", or scenic cantata in one act by Simon Mayr to a libretto by Giovanni Schmidt. It was premiered at the Teatro San Carlo, Naples, on 19 February 1815 with the role of Ariadne sung by Isabella Colbran who had requested Mayr to compose the piece for her to showcase her skills.

Recordings
Arianna in Nasso - :de:Cornelia Horak (soprano, Arianna), Thomas Michael Allen (tenor, Bacco) Simon Mayr Chorus and Ensemble, directed from the harpsichord by Franz Hauk Naxos 1CD

References

1815 compositions
Compositions by Simon Mayr